Irena Eichlerówna (19 April 1908 – 12 September 1990) was a Polish actress. She was considered to be "Poland's Eleonora Duse".

Filmography

Film
 1933 - Wyrok życia
 1936 - Róża
 1938 - Krwawa rosa
 1948 - Ślepy tor
 1966 - Szyfry

Theatre
 1964 - Kochany kłamca played Beatrice Stella Campbell
 1967 - Król Edyp played Jokasta
 1967 - Wdowa po pułkowniku
 1968 - Korespondencja Chopina
 1972 - Dwa teatry played Matka
 1977 - Mindowe played Rogneda
 1978 - Filomena Marturano played Filomena
 1984 - Wspomnienie played Sara Bernhardt

References

Polish actresses
Polish stage actresses
1908 births
1990 deaths
Polish film actresses
Actresses from Warsaw
20th-century Polish actresses